Aleksandr Osipovich (born 22 March 1977) is a Belarusian former professional footballer. After retirement, he works as a football agent.

Honours
Dinamo Minsk
Belarusian Premier League champion: 1997

Sūduva
Lithuanian Cup winner: 2006

References

External links 
 
 
 Profile at lfe.lt

1977 births
Living people
Belarusian footballers
Association football midfielders
Belarus under-21 international footballers
Belarusian expatriate footballers
Expatriate footballers in Lithuania
Expatriate footballers in Poland
A Lyga players
Belarusian Premier League players
FC Dinamo-Juni Minsk players
FC Dinamo Minsk players
FK Žalgiris players
Zagłębie Lubin players
FC Darida Minsk Raion players
FC Partizan Minsk players
Polonia Warsaw players
FC ZLiN Gomel players
Radomiak Radom players
FC Vitebsk players
FK Sūduva Marijampolė players
Interas-AE Visaginas players
FC Gorodeya players
Footballers from Minsk